The 1960 Florida A&M Rattlers football team was an American football team that represented Florida A&M University as a member of the Southern Intercollegiate Athletic Conference (SIAC) during the 1960 NCAA College  Division football season. The team was ranked No. 5 in the final 1960 UPI coaches small college poll. The team played its home games at Bragg Memorial Stadium in Tallahassee, Florida. 

The team's 97 points and 14 touchdowns against  remain school records. The 1960 Rattlers also broke an NAIA scoring record with 475 points in nine regular season games (52.7 points per game).

Scatback Clarence Childs was selected as the captain of the All-SIAC team.  Other key players included quarterback Emory Collier, halfback Robert Paremore, fullback Hewritt Dixon, and center Curt Miranda.

Schedule

References

Florida AandM
Florida A&M Rattlers football seasons
Florida AandM Rattlers football